Hakalau Forest National Wildlife Refuge is a protected area on the Big Island of Hawaii. It is one of two units, along with the Kona Forest National Wildlife Refuge that is managed as part of the Big Island National Wildlife Refuge Complex.  Access to the Kona Forest is restricted since it contains several endangered species.

Description
Hakalau Forest NWR contains some of the finest remaining stands of native montane wet forest in Hawaii. The slopes below  feet receive very high rainfall -  annually. Bogs, fern patches, and scrubby forest dominate this area, which is dissected by numerous deep gulches. Since 1989, over 400,000 koa, ōhia, and other native plants have been planted in this area as part of the refuge's reforestation program.
The Pua Akala Cabin, located within the refuge, was nominated to the National Register of Historic Places in August 2008.

In 1985,  on the eastern slope of Mauna Kea were established as the Hakalau Forest Unit. 
In 1997, the Fish and Wildlife Service purchased an additional  of land to create the Kona Forest Unit of Hakalau Forest NWR. One of the primary purposes for the creation of this unit was to protect the habitat of the alalā (Corvus hawaiiensis), which is now extinct in the wild.
The Kona Forest district is somewhat drier than the Hakalau Unit.

Wildlife and habitat
Much of Hawaii's native lowland habitat was first degraded following the Polynesians’ arrival over a thousand years ago. In the late 18th century, cattle, goats, and European pigs were additionally released into the forests, and hundreds of additional alien plants, animals, and insects have subsequently been introduced. Most lowland plants seen today like the orchid, ginger, and plumeria are aliens or nonnative. Introduced animals such as mosquitoes, wasps, small Asian mongooses, cats, and rats have also harmed Hawaiian habitat and native species.

Grazing pressure by cattle and pigs has resulted in the replacement of Hawaiian plants by more competitive alien grasses and shrubs within the upper portions of Hakalau Forest. Below this pasture area, the native tree canopy is still intact, but the native understory has been replaced by alien grasses, blackberry (Rubus spp.), banana poka (Passiflora tarminiana), and English holly (Ilex aquifolium). The replacement process may have been accelerated by efforts to create more pasture land through bulldozing and burning, and by logging mature trees for timber and fence posts.

Eight of the 14 native bird species occurring at Hakalau are endangered. Thirteen migratory bird species and 20 introduced species, including eight game birds, as well as the endangered opeapea (Hawaiian hoary bat, Lasiurus cinereus semotus) also frequent the refuge. Twenty-nine rare plant species are known from the refuge and adjacent lands. Twelve are currently listed as endangered. Two endangered lobelias have fewer than five plants known to exist in the wild.

Climate

According to the Köppen Climate Classification system, Hakalau has an oceanic climate, abbreviated "Cfb" on climate maps.

Recreation
To prevent spread of Rapid ʻŌhiʻa Death, the refuge is closed to self-guided visits. Guided visits on a commercial tour can be arranged for hiking and birdwatching.

References

External links

Hakalau Forest National Wildlife Refuge
Friends of Hakalau Forest National Wildlife Refuge

Protected areas of Hawaii (island)
National Wildlife Refuges in Hawaii
Protected areas established in 1985
Forests of Hawaii
Landforms of Hawaii (island)
Wetlands of Hawaii
1985 establishments in Hawaii